A Stock exchange is a corporation or mutual organization which provides facilities for stockbrokers and traders to trade stocks and other securities. It may be a physical trading room where the traders gather, or a formalised communications network.
Creation of a stock exchange is a strategy of economic development: it provides a means of raising capital for investment. 
Stock markets may enhance economic activity through the creation of liquidity: a liquid equity market makes investment more attractive because it allows individuals to acquire equity and when required to sell it quickly and cheaply. At the same time, companies enjoy permanent access to capital raised through equity issues.
It has been found that countries that open stock markets grow faster, on average, than the control groups.

An alternative view is that market liquidity may also hurt economic growth, because it encourages short-termism. A downside of raising capital on a stock exchange is that it may result in loss of company control, typically to powerful large investors. Foreign ownership of securities and assets is often unappealing. Extremely low income levels keep share ownership beyond the reach of most people in developing countries.

Countries without a stock exchange include Democratic Republic of the Congo.

The Mongolian Stock Exchange  was the world's smallest stock exchange by market capitalisation.

Planned

Angola

The Angola Debt and Stock Exchange (Bodiva) is a stock exchange in Angola. First announced in 2006, the Stock Exchange was hoping to open during the first quarter of the 2008 fiscal year, though in August 2008 Aguinaldo Jaime said that the launch would be "a task for the next government... maybe late 2008 or the beginning of 2009". On December 19, 2014, the capital market in Angola started.

Afghanistan Stock Exchange
Afghanistan Stock Exchange is part of the planned Economic development of Afghanistan. It will operate Afghanistan's first liquid exchange to offer the most diverse array of financial products and services. AFX will bring together cash equities exchanges and foreign exchanges, to be the leader for listings, trading in cash equities, equity and interest rate derivatives, bonds and the distribution of market data in Afghanistan.
As a stock exchange market is supposed to have four types of deals: cash, mutual fund, stocks and bonds but practically AFX is only capable of Forex deals.

New or revised

Maldives Stock Exchange

The Maldives Stock Exchange, is a private sector Stock Exchange in Malé. It was first established on 14 April 2002. It is very small, with only 10 companies listed.

Iraq Stock Exchange

The Iraq Stock Exchange was incorporated and began operations in June 2004.  It operates under the oversight of the Iraq Securities Commission, an independent commission modeled after the U.S. Securities and Exchange Commission.
Before the 2003 invasion of Iraq, it was called the Baghdad Stock Exchange and was operated by the Iraqi Ministry of Finance. Now it is a self-regulated organization like the New York Stock Exchange, owned by the 50 or so member brokerage firms.
The trading floor is now open six hours a week.

Trading is done with pen and paper. Buyers shout at or call into their brokers, who stand their white dry-erase boards that list each company's share buy and sell price. This continues despite plans to implement electronic trading.

Trading was suspended for several months in 2006 due to violence, and is subject to power outages.

The ISX opened to foreign investors on August 2, 2007.

Dar es Salaam Stock Exchange

The Dar es Salaam Stock Exchange is a stock exchange located in Dar es Salaam, the largest city in Tanzania. It was incorporated in September 1996 and trading started in April 1998; it is a member of the African Stock Exchanges Association.  There are currently 27 listed companies.

Douala Stock Exchange

The Douala Stock Exchange  is the official market for securities in Cameroon.  It is located in Douala.
It  was created in December 2001. Until 2006, its sole listing was Société des Eaux Minérales du Cameroun (SEMC). Now it also includes Société Africaine Forestière et Agricole du Cameroun (SAFACAM).

See also
Emerging markets
List of countries by Failed States Index
Development aid
Least Developed Countries
List of stock exchanges
African Stock Exchanges Association
World Federation of Exchanges
Financial Market Theory of Development

Papers
Atje, R. and Jovanovic, B. (1993). Stock Markets and Development. European Economic Review, 37 (2), 632–640.
Demirg ̈ ̧-Kunt, A. and Levine, R. (1996). Stock Markets, Corporate Finance, and Economic Growth: An Overview. World Bank Economic Review, 10 (2), 223–239.
Goldsmith, R. W. (1969). Financial Structure and Development. Yale University Press.
Minier, J. A. (2000). Are Small Stock Markets Different?. Manuscript.

References

Stock exchanges
Economic development